Zhonghai Emeishan (中海峨眉山) is the world's largest floating drydock. It is used for the repair and reconstruction of very large ships.

Built in only 416 days, it was launched in September 2008 in Yangzhou in a ceremony involving senior municipal officials, including the mayor. It was delivered to the Shanghai Changxing ship repair base in October 2008. Construction cost 580 million Yuan; it has a high level of automation.

Specifications
Length: 410m
Beam: 82m
Moulded depth: 28m
Displacement: 42000 tonnes
Lifting capacity: 85000 tonnes

See also
 List of world's longest ships
 No.5 Royal Dock

External links
 Description on China Tech Gadget

References

Floating drydocks
2008 ships